Chambiortyx is a genus of Galliformes bird. It is known from a fossil of the early Eocene of Tunisia.

References

Prehistoric bird genera
Galliformes
Eocene birds
Prehistoric birds of Africa
Fossil taxa described in 2013